Konardan or Kenardan may refer to:
 Konardan, Firuzabad, Fars Province
 Konardan, Jahrom, Fars Province
 Konardan, Larestan, Fars Province
 Konardan, Hormozgan
 Konardan, Parsian, Hormozgan Province
 Konardan-e Sharqi, Hormozgan Province
 Konardan, Saravan, Sistan and Baluchestan Province
 Konardan, Nik Shahr, Sistan and Baluchestan Province